The Freeman-Felker House is a historic house at 318 West Elm Street in Rogers, Arkansas, United States.  It is a large two-story wood-frame structure, designed by local architect A. O. Clark and built in 1903 for a banker.  The house has a pyramidal roof and a wraparound porch with Classical Revival detailing.  A large gable projects slightly on the main facade, with a Palladian window at its center.  The house includes a sunroom, added in the 1930s by its second owner, J. E. Felker, and also designed by Clark.

The house was listed on the National Register of Historic Places in 1988.

See also
National Register of Historic Places listings in Benton County, Arkansas

References

Houses on the National Register of Historic Places in Arkansas
Neoclassical architecture in Arkansas
Houses completed in 1903
Houses in Rogers, Arkansas
National Register of Historic Places in Benton County, Arkansas